Hiroden Streetcar Route #6 "Hiroshima Station - Eba Route" runs between Hiroshima Station and Eba Station.

Overview

Lines
Hiroden Streetcar route #6 is made up with next two lines. The train goes straight through from each side.
█ Hiroden Main Line
█ Hiroden Eba Line

Stations

References 

6